Manmath Chandra Mallik (1853–1922) or Manmatha Chandra Mallik, was a British barrister, writer and Liberal Party candidate.

Life
Manmath Mallik was born in Calcutta, India, into a branch of the Basu Mallik family. He was the second son of Jaygopal Basu Mallik, and Krishabhabini Dasi Dutta. He was called to the bar in 1875.

Mallik was defeated as the main challenger and the Liberal candidate for St George's Hanover Square in 1906;  then for the Uxbridge county-division seat in the second election of 1910. He was a Fellow of the Zoological Society of London. His social clubs were in four cities: National Liberal in London; Scottish Liberal, Edinburgh; Calcutta, Calcutta; Tokyo, Tokyo. He died on 13 June 1922 at the Regent Palace Hotel, London, with executor named as his son Jay, leaving effects of £250.

Despite the family home being 12 Wellington Square, his main address is given as 241 Lower Circular Road, Calcutta; his probate also gives Nikko, Japan and Middle Temple.

Family
Mallik had five children with his wife. With the exception of Jay Paul Harabhajan, and Lucia Harabandini, they died young.

 Jay Paul married Barbara Nowell and had one daughter, Anne-Marie Mallik.
 Lucia married Dr. Chidamber N. Chitnis and had four children: Jay-Gopal, Indira, Pratap, and Anand.

Publications
Problem of Existence, 1904
Impressions of a Wanderer, 1907
A Study in Ideals; Great Britain and India, 1912
Orient and Occident: A Comparative Study, 1914

Further reading 
 De, Amalendu (1996). Raja Subodh Chandra Mallik and his times. Bengal: National Council of Education.

References

1853 births
20th-century British politicians
20th-century British writers
1922 deaths
British barristers
Anglo-Indian people